The following is a list of national roads in Tanzania, under the jurisdiction of the Tanzania National Roads Agency (TANROADS). The list is not exhaustive.

National roads

International roads

See also
Transport in Tanzania

References

External links
 Webpage of Tanzania National Roads Agency

Transport in Tanzania
Tanzania transport-related lists
Tanzania
Roads